Elisha Henig (born October 30, 2004) is an American actor.

Personal life and career 
Elisha Henig grew up in Portland, Oregon, and became interested in acting after taking a Shakespeare class at the age of eight. He began acting in guest roles in various TV productions at the age of 10, such as Grey's Anatomy, Adam Ruins Everything and Mr. Robot. Henig was a main cast member playing the protagonist role of Julian in the second season of the USA Network drama The Sinner, and alongside Zach Braff in Alex, Inc.   Other roles include Miles in Season 2 of American Vandal, young Ramy Youssef in an episode of Ramy that dealt with growing up during 9/11 and garnered media attention. In 2020, he played the role of Pootie-Shoe, a video game streamer, in Mythic Quest.

Filmography

References

External links
 
 

2004 births
American male child actors
American male television actors
Male actors from Portland, Oregon
Living people